The 2004 CAF Champions League was the 40th edition of the CAF Champions League, the Africa's premier club football tournament prize organized by the Confederation of African Football (CAF). Enyimba of Nigeria defeated Étoile du Sahel of Tunisia in the final to win their second title.

Qualifying rounds

Preliminary round

1 US Stade Tamponnaise refused to participate; they were banned from CAF competitions for two years and fined $3000. 
2 AS Tempête Mocaf and Ulinzi Stars withdrew before 1st leg. 
3 ASC Nasr de Sebkha withdrew before the 2nd leg.

First round

Second round

Group stage

Group A

Group B

Knockout stage

Bracket

Semifinals

Final

Best Scorers
The top scorers from the 2004 CAF Champions League are as follows:

External links
Champions' Cup 2004 - rsssf.com

 
CAF Champions League seasons
1